Real, officially the Municipality of Real (Ilocano: Ili ti Real), is a 1st class municipality in the province of Quezon, Philippines. According to the 2020 census, it has a population of 38,678 people.

This coastal town, located on the eastern shores of Luzon facing the Philippine Sea, is noted for its rural beach resorts.

Geography
Real has 17 barangays: 14 rural and 3 urban. Its total land area is 563.8 km2, the second largest in the province.

Tourist spots include zigzag road views, Balagbag Falls, river scenery, and Baluti Island. It also has tourist-frequented beaches known for surfing.

Barangays
Real is politically subdivided into 17 barangays.

Climate

History
Spanish forces landed at the site of Real early in the colonization period, calling it "San Rafael". Spanish galleons and ships docked at the port "Puerto Real De Lampon" reinforced forces stationed at the nearby place "Binangonan De Lampon" now known as Infanta. Located at the coast of Polillo Strait, it was frequently vulnerable to attacks by Muslim sea pirates and bandits. The first inhabitants of the place came from barangays of Binangonan Del Ampon.

Formerly a barrio of Infanta, Real was created into a municipal district comprising the barrios of Llavac, Cawayan, Capalong, Tignoan, Kiloloron, Lubayat and Pandan which were all segregated from the mother town of Infanta by virtue of Executive Order No. 410 dated December 15, 1960, signed by President Carlos P. Garcia. It was later converted to a regular municipality through Republic Act No. 3754 dated June 22, 1963.

On November 29, 2004, Real was hit hard by Typhoons Winnie, Violeta, and Yoyong. About 500 people were either killed or missing.

Etymology

The origin of the name Real has no traditional folklore as basis. Its name originated as a result of the landing of the Spanish forces in the place during its regime. The Spaniards made it part of its territory naming it “Puerto Real”, where the name of the municipality was derived. Spanish dalleons and ships docked at the port, while reinforced forces were stationed at the nearby Binangonan De Lampon (now Infanta).

Demographics

Economy

References

External links

Real Profile at PhilAtlas.com
[ Philippine Standard Geographic Code]
Philippine Census Information
Local Governance Performance Management System

Municipalities of Quezon
Establishments by Philippine executive order